Courken George Deukmejian Jr. (
June 6, 1928 – May 8, 2018) was an American politician who served as the 35th governor of California from 1983 to 1991. A member of the Republican Party, he was the state's first governor of Armenian descent and the second overall in history. 

Born in New York, Deukmejian moved to California in 1955. He was elected to the State Assembly in 1962 to represent Long Beach. Four years later he was elected into the State Senate and later served as the Senate's minority leader. In 1970, Deukmejian unsuccessfully ran for Attorney General of California, finishing fourth in the Republican primary. In 1978 he secured the nomination and defeated Yvonne Brathwaite Burke to become the state's 27th attorney general. As attorney general, he led a veto override against Governor Jerry Brown, who had vetoed legislation to authorize the death penalty in the state.

After governor Brown did not seek reelection in 1982, Deukmejian won the Republican nomination for governor and faced Los Angeles mayor Tom Bradley in the general election. Although opinion polls showed that Bradley had a favorable lead in the race, Deukmejian narrowly won the election outright. In 1986, Deukmejian defeated Bradley again for a much larger victory. As governor, Deukmejian made a name for being tough on crime, presenting himself to be in favor of "law and order". Under his administration, the California prison population nearly tripled, and he increased spending for the building of new prisons.

Deukmejian retired from front-line politics in 1991 and was succeeded as governor by fellow Republican Pete Wilson.

Early life and education
Deukmejian was born Courken George Deukmejian Jr. in Menands, New York. His parents were Armenians born in the Armenian Highlands, who emigrated from the Ottoman Empire to the United States in the early 1900s. His father, Courken George Deukmejian, whose sister was killed during the Armenian Genocide, was a rug merchant born in Aintab. Deukmejian's mother, Alice Gairden, was born in Erzurum; in the United States she worked for Montgomery Ward and later for New York State.

Deukmejian attended local schools. For college, he graduated in 1949 with a B.A. in Sociology from Siena College. He earned a Juris Doctor (J.D.) from St. John's University in New York City in 1952. From 1953 to 1955, he served in the U.S. Army, assigned to the Judge Advocate General's Corps (JAG).

Move to California
Deukmejian moved to California in 1955 where his sister, Anna Ashjian, was living and there was a large Armenian community. She introduced him to his future wife Gloria Saatjian, a bank teller whose parents were also immigrants from Armenia. They married on February 16, 1957. He and his wife had three children: two daughters, born in 1964 and 1969; and one son, born in 1966.

Political career 

Deukmejian entered politics in California after a short period of private legal practice in Long Beach alongside Malcolm M. Lucas. In 1962, Deukmejian was elected to represent Long Beach in the State Assembly.

In 1966, he was elected as a state senator, serving from 1967 to 1979. He was a high-profile advocate for capital punishment. By 1969, he was the Majority Leader of the California State Senate.

He first ran for Attorney General of California in 1970, finishing fourth in the Republican primary. He won the election for Attorney General in 1978 and served from 1979 to 1983. During this time, he led a high-profile campaign against cannabis in northern California. Additionally, he led a veto override against Governor Jerry Brown, who had vetoed legislation to authorize the death penalty.

Governorship 

Deukmejian was elected in 1982 to his first term as Governor of California. He first defeated Lieutenant Governor Mike Curb, a recording company owner, in the Republican primary. One of his early primary backers was former gubernatorial candidate Joe Shell of Bakersfield, a conservative who had opposed Richard M. Nixon in the 1962 California primary. Upon his victory, The New York Times reported, 
"The image that comes across of Mr. Deukmejian - a devoted family man, an Episcopal churchman, an ice cream lover - led one reporter to write, ''California may have accidentally elected Iowa's Governor.''"

In the general election, Deukmejian ran as a conservative supporter of public safety and balanced budgets. In addition, he was strongly critical of outgoing Governor Jerry Brown and promised to run a very different administration. He strongly criticized the Supreme Court of California, which was dominated by Brown appointees, notably controversial Chief Justice Rose Bird.

Deukmejian narrowly defeated Los Angeles Mayor Tom Bradley in the general election. Deukmejian won the election by about 100,000 votes, about 1.2 percent of the 7.5 million votes cast. The victory came despite opinion polls leading up to the election that consistently showed Bradley with a lead, and despite exit polling conducted after voting closed that led some news organizations on the night of the election to make early projections of a Bradley victory. The discrepancy between the polling numbers and the election's ultimate results would come to be termed the "Bradley effect", which refers to a hypothesized tendency of white voters to tell interviewers or pollsters that they are undecided or likely to vote for a black candidate, but they actually vote for his opponent.

Deukmejian's governorship was certainly a departure from that of his predecessor, Jerry Brown. He vowed not to raise taxes, later saying that he was "business friendly". In addition, he presented himself as a "law and order" candidate, proposing new efforts to fight crime. He faced a Democrat-dominated California State Legislature during his two terms as governor. He was the sole Republican statewide officeholder until Thomas W. Hayes was appointed California State Treasurer, following the death of Treasurer Jesse Unruh.

In 1983, Deukmejian abolished the Caltrans Office of Bicycle Facilities and reduced state spending for bicycle projects from $5 million to the statutory minimum of $360,000 per year. In 1984, he vetoed A.B. 1, the first bill to ban discrimination against gays and lesbians, which passed the Legislature.

In 1986, Bradley sought a rematch, and Deukmejian defeated him by a 60% to 37% percent margin. He was generally regarded as a moderate-to-conservative Republican.

The Deukmejian administration began during a national economic recession. He halted the hiring of new state employees and banned out-of-state travel for those in government. He rejected the legislature's demands for tax hikes, and pared $1.1 billion from its budget by selectively vetoing spending items. One year later, further cuts, along with a nationwide economic rebound that benefited the state, created a billion dollar surplus for 1985. His 1985 budget slightly increased spending in highway construction, but cut deeply into the education, health, welfare and environmental budgets. For this he was roundly criticized, and the cuts probably led to his low polling numbers at the end of his tenure as governor.

Three years later, Deukmejian faced his own billion dollar deficit. He supported a raise in the state minimum wage in 1989.

Deukmejian largely made his career by being tough on crime. When he was in the legislature, he wrote California's capital punishment law. As a candidate for reelection, in 1986 he opposed the retention election of three Brown-appointed justices of the Supreme Court of California due to their consistent opposition to the death penalty in any and all circumstances. The best known of these was Rose Bird, the first female Chief Justice of the Court (and the first one to be voted off). Deukmejian elevated his friend and law partner, Malcolm M. Lucas, from Associate Justice to Chief Justice, and appointed three new associate justices. Under Deukmejian, the California prison population nearly tripled — as of December 31, 1982, the total prison population stood at 34,640 inmates. He increased spending for the building of new prisons.

In 1988, then-Vice President George H. W. Bush considered Governor Deukmejian as a possible running mate for the presidential election that year. During a trade mission to South Korea in August, Deukmejian sent a letter saying he could not be considered for nomination, refusing to leave the governorship to Democratic Lieutenant Governor Leo T. McCarthy.

Deukmejian did not seek reelection to a third term as governor in the 1990 gubernatorial elections. The Republicans instead nominated sitting United States Senator Pete Wilson, who defeated Dianne Feinstein in the general election. He was the last governor not affected by the two-term limit that was passed by voters in 1990.

On October 1, 1989, Governor Deukmejian signed legislation authorizing the purchasing of health insurance by uninsured Californians suffering from catastrophic serious illnesses, such as AIDS, cancer, diabetes, and heart disease, to be funded through tobacco tax revenues.

In 1991, in his last days in office, he vetoed the property tax exemption bill that applied to companies building solar in California. This exemption was focused toward the Solar Energy Generating Systems (SEGS) plants then being built by Luz International Limited (Luz). The veto led to the bankruptcy of Luz.

Post-governorship 

Deukmejian was a partner in the law firm of Sidley & Austin from 1991 until 2000 when he retired. He reentered public life by serving on special committees, including one to reform the California penal system, and a charter-reform committee in his hometown of Long Beach. He oversaw a revamping of the UCLA Willed Body Program after a scandal involving the sale of human body parts donated for science. In 2013, a courthouse in Long Beach was named in his honor. Deukmejian received an honorary doctor of laws degree from California State University, Long Beach, in 2008, because of his support for education, state law, and Long Beach. In 2015, he was given the Key to the City of Long Beach.

Death
Deukmejian resided in the Belmont Park neighborhood of Long Beach for over 51 years.  He died of natural causes at his home on May 8, 2018, at the age of 89. California Governor Jerry Brown said on Twitter: "George Deukmejian was a popular governor and made friends across the political aisle. Anne and I join all Californians in expressing our deepest condolences to his family and friends".

References

External links 

 George Deukmejian 1983–1991; The Governors Gallery, California State Library.
 Join California George Deukmejian

|-

|-

|-

|-

|-

1928 births
2018 deaths
American people of Armenian descent
Republican Party governors of California
California Attorneys General
Republican Party California state senators
Republican Party members of the California State Assembly
Military personnel from New York (state)
People from Menands, New York
People from Long Beach, California
Siena College alumni
St. John's University (New York City) alumni
United States Army officers
Ethnic Armenian politicians
20th-century American Episcopalians
20th-century American politicians
Military personnel from California